Christ the Vine may refer to:
 Christ the Vine (Moskos), a tempera painting by Leos Moskos
 Christ the Vine (Victor), an egg tempera painting by Victor